Opera station may refer to:

Opera (Antwerp premetro station), in Antwerp, Belgium
Opéra (Paris Métro), in Paris, France
Ópera (Madrid Metro), in Madrid, Spain
Opera metro station (Budapest), in Budapest, Hungary
Guangzhou Opera House station, in Guangzhou, China

See also
Opera (disambiguation)